is a Japanese manga artist. After his debut in 2005, he serialized Hyde & Closer from December 2007 to July 2009, and Alice in Borderland from November 2010 to March 2016. After retiring from illustrating, he did the story for Zom 100: Bucket List of the Dead in October 2018 and Noyu Girl in August 2021.

Biography
Haro Asō was born in Osaka, Japan. He attended Kansai University, but later dropped out. He made his debut as a manga artist in 2005 with YUNGE!. On December 26, 2007, Asō launched Hyde & Closer. The series finished its serialization on July 3, 2009. Following Hyde & Closers completion, Asō launched Alice in Borderland on November 25, 2010. The series concluded on March 2, 2016. At the time of the manga's conclusion, it had 1.3 million copies in circulation. The manga was also given two major adaptations, an original video animation series and a live-action television series. Following Alice in Borderlands completion, Asō intended to retire from drawing, though he came out of retirement to draw a spin-off after the television series' release.

Starting on October 19, 2018, Asō did the story of the manga series Zom 100: Bucket List of the Dead; Kotaro Takata did the illustrations. Starting on August 20, 2021, Asō will do the story for another manga series, Noyu Girl; Shirō Yoshida will do the illustrations.

Works
 YUNGE! (one-shot published in Weekly Shōnen Sunday Cho) (2005)
  (serialized in Weekly Shōnen Sunday and Club Sunday) (2007–2009)
  (serialized in Shōnen Sunday S and Weekly Shōnen Sunday) (2010–2016)
  (serialized in Monthly Sunday Gene-X; illustrated by Kotaro Takata) (2018–present)
 Noyu Girl (serialized in Yawaraka Spirits; illustrated by Shirō Yoshida) (2021–2022)
 Sex-chan (serialized in Comic Cmoa; written by Tatsunari Iota and illustrated by Mano Sakamoto) (2022)

References

External links
 

Living people
Manga artists from Osaka Prefecture
Year of birth missing (living people)
Kansai University alumni